Kampot is a city in southern Cambodia and the capital of Kampot Province. Kampot was the capital of the Circonscription Résidentielle de Kampot under French rule and Cambodia's most important seaport after the loss of the Mekong Delta and before the establishment of Sihanoukville. Its center is, unlike most Cambodian provincial capitals, composed of 19th century French colonial architecture. The region and town are known for high quality pepper, which is exported worldwide. It is also known for its Kampot fish sauce, and durian. The government and the Ministry of Culture and Fine Art have been preparing documents to nominate The Old Town of Kampot for admission to the UNESCO World Heritage Site list (along with The Old Town of Battambang and The Old Town of Kratie) since 2017.

History

A Khmer breach between Siam and Ha-Tien since 1771 
The first description of Kampot in the Cambodian Royal Chronicles refers to an event that took place from 1771 to 1775. In 1771, King Taksin of Siam attacked Ha-Tien and destroyed it completely before marching on the Cambodian capital Oudong.

In an effort to overthrow the Khmer King Outey II who was allied with Vietnamese Mac Thien Tu based in Ha-Tien, the young Khmer prince and future king Ang Non II gathered with Siamese soldiers in Kampot which he used as a base for his hostilities until obtaining the throne 1775.

The uprising of Oknha Mau in 1841 
In 1841, Oknha-Mau, who was a Cambodian governor, refused the Vietnamese yoke which had gradually been imposed once more on Kampot. Supported by Siam, he gathered a military contingent of about 3,000 Cambodians. The Vietnamese ran away to Ha-Tien again.

The first international seaport of Cambodia (1841-1860) 
Upon his arrival on the throne in 1840, Khmer King Ang Duong constructed a road from his capital of Oudong, to Kampot, and opened Kampot as the only international seaport of Cambodia. Import and exports grew quickly in the hands of the Anglo-Chinese merchants of Singapore turning a neighborhood of the city into the Chinese Kampot. French missionary Father Hestret founded the first Catholic Church in Kampot at that time, and received the visit of French explorer Henri Mouhot.

From the French protectorate to the insurrection (1863-1886) 
Cambodia became a protectorate of France in 1863. King Norodom appointed a Vietnamese as chief of the canton and let him control the village and all Vietnamese in this province. After this period, Kampot began to decline.  The main reason for this decline was because Saigon Port was opened and navigation along the Mekong River began to be exploited in the interests of French colonialism. 

Resentment grew among the population. The insurrection began on 17 March 1885 at noon, when a band of 50 men sacked the opium entrepôt held by the French colonialists. Another band of 50 men
attacked the telegraph office. The customhouse at the entrance of the river
became a fort of insurgents. At the beginning of April, a French aviso à vapeur Le Sagittaire and two junks appeared at the anchorage of Kampot. Tensions escalated as violence broke out throughout the province with a complex play of alliances and betrayals as well as interference from Chinese pirates. On 8 May 1886, a column of 100 soldiers under Lieutenant de Vaubert departed Kampot. Résident Santenoy also marched with 30 militiamen. After an hour's battle, a Cambodian militiaman of the Résident succeeded in penetrating into the fort of the insurgents, and French troops broke the fort in five minutes officially ending the insurrection of Kampot.

At the end of 1886, an interview between the King Sisowath and the insurgents was held at Thnol Bek Kus, half-way between Phnom Penh and Kampot and peace was accomplished.

Kampot of the Belle Epoque (1889-1940) 
Under 19th century French colonial administration Kampot became a regional administrative centre with the status of a state border district as a result of the delimitation of the Kingdom of Cambodia. The Circonscription Résidentielle de Kampot contained the arrondissements of Kampot, Kompong-Som, Trang, and Kong-Pisey.

In 1889 French colonial census reports a multi-ethnic community: Kampot town consisted of "Cambodian Kampot" on the Prek-Kampot River and "Chinese Kampot" on the right riverbank of the west branch of the Prek-Thom River. Nearby was also a Vietnamese village, called Tien-Thanh and another Vietnamese village on Traeuy Koh Island. A Malay enclave also existed on Traeuy Koh Island. Additional villages of mixed ethnicity are listed.

The Chinese population grew steadily, benefited well from pepper cultivation and benefiting the economy of Kampot. Yet quarrels between Chinese groups were reported too. For example, Hainam Chinese and Trieu-Châu Chinese quarreled in October 1908, and Inspecteur Durand, had to send in guards to reach pacify the situation.

Kampot during the War

Kampot during the Khmers Rouges 

Kampot become the stage to a major battle of the Vietnam War, also a part of the Cambodian Civil War. From 26 February to 2 April 1974, Cambodian government troops battled Khmer Rouge guerillas for the control of Kampot city. Despite the Cambodian Army's heavy resistance, the Khmer Rouge eventually captured the city of Kampot on 2 April. Both sides suffered heavy casualties during the fighting but many more civilians were rendered homeless.

Kampot contemporary history 
In recent years since 2010s, Kampot has been subject to the extensive tourism development with the development of tourism port worth US$8 million under the Kampot Provincial Tourism Department's master plan. The development of the tourism port includes the construction of 42-storey multi-purposed twin tower which will be the tallest building in Cambodia outside Phnom Penh when completed; widening and improvements to National Road No. 3; a seaport that carries passengers to and from nearby Cambodian islands, Thailand and Vietnam with the capacity of housing up to 400 passengers. While the development of the tourism port is slated to be ready for visitors by 2022 and the creation of new job opportunities, the development of the tourism port has raised concern regarding the impact to the colonial building where some colonial building would be demolished to make way for the modern building and infrastructure, the rising price of the land property in Kampot, and the destruction of forests for tourism land uses which raises the environmental concerns. A petition has been launched by residents of Kampot demanding Prime Minister Hun Sen and King Norodom Sihamoni to modify the project toward more heritage-friendly construction and move the construction of high-rise buildings away from Old Town. As of January 2021, it has received 1,239 signatures.

Demographics 
According to the 2012 census, the population of the municipality of Kampot is 49,597. Historically, there has been an important presence of Khmers of Chinese descent in Kampot. Recent years have seen an important inflow of foreigners, European, Vietnamese, and Chinese. A significant part of the population is Cham, a minority Muslim group. The Sa'och tribe, an ancient population group in the province, is on the brink of extinction however.

Administration 
The municipality of Kampot is located in Kampot province and is divided into 15 villages and 5 Sangkats which are:
 Kampong Kandal Sangkat
 Krang Ampil 
 Kampong Bay 
 Andong Khmer
 Traeuy Kaoh

Crime and security 
Whilst Kampot is considered largely safe, the city has seen a rise in crime against tourists and foreign residents. Despite some efforts to provide better security and policing, local authorities have been criticized in recent years for their response to a number of high-profile serious crimes, including rapes and murders, that were dealt with poorly. As in neighbouring Sihanoukville, police in Kampot have been accused of corruption, drug trafficking and drug use, and links to organized crime. Some members of Kampot's expatriate community have also faced criticism for alleged attempts to censor, cover up, and control any negative news or reviews about the city, its businesses, and inhabitants, especially on social media groups and pages.

Gallery

See also
Battle of Kampot
Sihanoukville (city)
Svay Rieng City
Prey Veng City

References

External links

Cities in Cambodia
Populated places in Kampot province
Provincial capitals in Cambodia
Gulf of Thailand
Kampot province